Ostiano is a comune (municipality) in the Province of Cremona in the Italian region Lombardy, located about  southeast of Milan and about  northeast of Cremona.

Ostiano borders the following municipalities: Gabbioneta-Binanuova, Gambara, Pessina Cremonese, Pralboino, Seniga, Volongo.

Among the churches in the territory are:
 Oratory of the Disciplini 
 Pieve di San Gaudenzio former abbey church
 San Michele Arcangelo parish church
 Chiesa di Torricella Romanesque oratory

Demographic evolution

References

External links
 Comune di Ostiano

Cities and towns in Lombardy